Trisetum is a genus of plants in the grass family, widespread in temperate, subarctic, and alpine habitats in much of the world. Oatgrass is a common name for plants in this genus.

Species
 Known species are listed in list of Trisetum species.

References

 
Poaceae genera